Carl Köppen (23 August 1833 - 28 June 1907) was a German military advisor active in Japan at the start of the Meiji era.

Biography
A member of the Schaumburg-Lippe Jäger Battalion who rose rapidly through the ranks, Köppen was invited to teach in Japan as a foreign advisor providing training to troops loyal to the Kishū Domain. Based at Wakayama Castle between 1869 and 1871, Köppen specialized in Prussian Army drills and the use of the Doersch and von Baumgarten Needle gun.

References

1833 births
1907 deaths
People from Bückeburg
German expatriates in Japan
Foreign advisors to the government in Meiji-period Japan
Foreign educators in Japan
Military personnel from Lower Saxony